John Walker Rankin (June 11, 1823 – July 10, 1869) was an American politician and judge.

Born in Washington County, Pennsylvania, Rankin graduated from Washington & Jefferson College. He then taught school and studied law. Rankin was admitted to the Pennsylvania bar. In 1848, Rankin moved to Keokuk, Lee County, Iowa and continued to practice law. During the American Civil War, Rankin mustered the 17th Iowa Volunteer Infantry Regiment and served as colonel. In 1857, Rankin was appointed Iowa District Court judge for Lee County. From 1858 to 1862, Rankin served in the Iowa State Senate and was a Republican. Rankin died at his home in Keokuk, Iowa.

Notes

1823 births
1869 deaths
People from Washington County, Pennsylvania
People from Keokuk, Iowa
People of Iowa in the American Civil War
Washington & Jefferson College alumni
Pennsylvania lawyers
Iowa lawyers
Iowa state court judges
Republican Party Iowa state senators
19th-century American politicians
19th-century American judges
19th-century American lawyers